The Stone Arch Bridge, located near the intersection East Springfield Avenue and South Second Street in Champaign, Illinois was built in 1860. In c.2010, it was integrated into the design of the Boneyard Creek Second Street Basin, a flood control facility and recreational amenity which is located between First and Second Streets and Springfield and University Avenues.

The bridge was listed on the National Register of Historic Places in 1981.

References
Notes

External links

Tour of Boneyard Creek Phase 2 Improvements on Picasa, see in particular, photos 7 and 8
National Register nomination

Bridges completed in 1860
Road bridges on the National Register of Historic Places in Illinois
Buildings and structures in Champaign, Illinois
National Register of Historic Places in Champaign County, Illinois
Stone arch bridges in the United States
Transportation buildings and structures in Champaign County, Illinois